Harry Thomas Jr. (born October 21, 1960), is a Democratic politician in Washington, D.C. In 2006 he was elected to represent Ward 5 on the Council of the District of Columbia and served until his resignation in 2012, several hours after federal prosecutors filed charges of embezzlement and filing false tax returns against him.

Biography
Thomas is the son of late three-term Ward 5 Councilmember Harry Thomas Sr. and former D.C. Public School principal Romaine B. Thomas. Councilmember Thomas attended D.C. public schools and graduated from Woodrow Wilson High School. He holds a degree in Public Relations/Marketing from Bowie State University. Thomas was Vice President of Public Affairs for the Public Benefits Corporation (formerly D.C. General Hospital).

Thomas is a former Advisory Neighborhood Commissioner, and has served as Chair of the Woodridge Health Clinic. He is a past President of the D.C. Young Democrats and a former At-Large elected member of the D.C. Democratic State party, for which he coordinated local and national events. Councilmember Thomas has worked for the national Democratic Party, holding the office of Treasurer. He has also served as the Adult and Youth Chair of the Neighborhood Planning Council. Councilmember Thomas is a member of the YMCA, NAACP, Omega Psi Phi fraternity, and Woodridge Boys and Girls Club.

Political career
On September 12, 2006, Thomas won the Democratic primary for Ward 5 councilmember with 39 percent of the vote, beating 10 other candidates. The previous Ward 5 member, Vincent Orange, ran for mayor rather than running for reelection. On November 7, 2006, Thomas won the general election with 85 percent of the vote.  He was re-elected in 2010.

Felony conviction and incarceration
On June 6, 2011, the D.C. Attorney General released a report accusing Thomas of diverting public funds for personal use. Thomas was accused of using $300,000 in city grants that were earmarked for charity and youth baseball groups to pay for his personal expenses, including golfing vacations and an SUV, which was later seized by the FBI on December 2, 2011, in an ongoing investigation. Those baseball groups included the councilmember's own group, Team Thomas – although the Department of Consumer and Regulatory Affairs revoked corporate registration for Team Thomas in 2009, and the Internal Revenue Service never recognized it as a charity. A civil lawsuit filed against him by the district's attorney general was settled in July 2011 when Thomas agreed to repay the $300,000 in six installments over the next three years. Following this agreement, Thomas remained on the council and continued to maintain he was innocent of criminal behavior as the United States Attorney's Office continued to investigate the case.

He resigned his seat on January 5, 2012, several hours after federal prosecutors filed charges of embezzlement and filing false tax returns. Earlier that week he had failed to make his second installment payment on the repayment agreement, amid rumors of the pending criminal charges.  Represented by lawyer Karl Racine, on January 6 he pleaded guilty to felony counts of theft of government funds and falsifying tax returns.

Thomas' 39-month prison sentence began in June 2013. In 2014, the United States Marshals Service flew Thomas to the District of Columbia to meet with the United States Attorney's Office for an undisclosed reason. In August 2015, Thomas was transferred to a half-way house in Maryland, where he stayed for six months. Thomas' incarceration ended in March 2015.

Life as a returning citizen
In 2020, Thomas became a committeeman for the District of Columbia Democratic State Committee, representing Ward 5.

Committees
Committee on Libraries, Parks and Recreation (Chair)
Committee on Aging and Community Affairs
Committee on Government Operations and the Environment
Committee on Housing and Workforce Development
Committee on Public Services and Consumer Affairs

References

External links

Members of the Council of the District of Columbia
Living people
1960 births
Washington, D.C., Democrats
Bowie State University alumni
African-American people in Washington, D.C., politics
American politicians convicted of fraud
American people convicted of tax crimes
Washington, D.C., politicians convicted of crimes
Woodrow Wilson High School (Washington, D.C.) alumni
21st-century African-American people
20th-century African-American people